Ruellia dielsii is a species of plant in the family Acanthaceae. It is endemic to Ecuador.  Its natural habitat is subtropical or tropical moist montane forests.

References

Flora of Ecuador
dielsii
Data deficient plants
Taxonomy articles created by Polbot